Peter Jerrod Macon is an American actor. He is best known for his role as Lt. Commander Bortus in the Fox/Hulu television series The Orville (2017–present), and will portray an ape in Kingdom of the Planet of the Apes (2024).

Early life
Macon was raised in Minneapolis and attended North Community High School, where he acted in school plays. His mother was a teacher, and his father was a truck driver.

Macon later attended the San Francisco Art Institute and the Yale School of Drama, where he earned a master's degree in acting.

Macon married Lucia Brawley, an actress who also attended Yale, in 2005. Former New York City Mayor David Dinkins officiated. In 2018, Macon married Jacquelyn Woods.

Career

Stage theater
Macon acted for nearly 30 years at Twin Cities theaters including Penumbra, Illusion, and Children's Theatre Company, and he starred in the title role of Othello at the Guthrie Theater, as well as productions of the play in Dublin, Colorado, and Oregon.

Television
Macon has appeared in episodes of Nash Bridges, Law & Order, Without a Trace, Supernatural, The Shield, Dexter, Bosch, SEAL Team, and Shameless.

In 2017 Macon began playing Bortus in The Orville, a comedy-drama science fiction television series created by Seth MacFarlane that premiered on FOX on September 10 of that year.

Filmography

Film

Television

Video games

Awards
In 2002, Macon won a Primetime Emmy Award for Outstanding Voice-Over Performance for narrating the episode "John Henry, the Steel Driving Man" of the television series Animated Tales of the World.

References

External links
 

Living people
African-American male actors
American male film actors
American male stage actors
American male television actors
American male video game actors
American male voice actors
20th-century American male actors
21st-century American male actors
Yale School of Drama alumni
San Francisco Art Institute alumni
Primetime Emmy Award winners
Male actors from Minneapolis
Year of birth missing (living people)
Place of birth missing (living people)
North Community High School alumni
20th-century African-American people
21st-century African-American people